Cox Bluff may refer to:

 Cox Bluff (Antarctica)
 Cox Bluff (Tasmania)

See also 
 Cox (disambiguation)